Revilo is a given name, and is "Oliver" spelled backwards. Notable people with the name include:

 Revilo P. Oliver (1908–1994), American professor and polemicist
 Oliver Christianson, American cartoonist known by the pen name Revilo

Masculine given names